Stamford is the primary village and a census-designated place (CDP) in the town of Stamford, Bennington County, Vermont, United States. It was first listed as a CDP prior to the 2020 census.

The village is in southern Bennington County, in the southern part of the town of Stamford. It is bordered to the south by the towns of Clarksburg and Florida in Berkshire County, Massachusetts. Vermont Routes 8 and 100 pass through the village as its Main Street, leading northeast together  to Heartwellville. To the south, the road continues as Massachusetts Route 8, leading  to North Adams, Massachusetts.

Stamford is in the valley of the North Branch of the Hoosic River, between the  Hoosac Range to the east and the more gently rising Green Mountains to the west.

References 

Populated places in Bennington County, Vermont
Census-designated places in Bennington County, Vermont
Census-designated places in Vermont